Cudell is a neighborhood on the West Side of Cleveland, Ohio. Named after Frank E. Cudell, the neighborhood has been a part of Cleveland since 1904, upon the completion of municipal annexation of the land by the city.

In 2014, the Cudell Recreation Center was the site of the shooting of Tamir Rice.

For Cleveland City Council, the Cudell neighborhood is split between the 11th and 15th wards, and is represented jointly by council members Danny Kelly and Jenny Spencer.

References

External links

Cudell Improvement Inc.

Neighborhoods in Cleveland